Wing Coaster is engineering firm Bolliger & Mabillard’s designation for its winged roller coaster designs.  Winged roller coasters are a type of steel roller coaster where pairs of riders sit on either side of a roller coaster track in which nothing is above or below the riders. B&M began development on the first Wing Coaster between 2007 and 2008 leading to the opening of Raptor at Gardaland on 1 April 2011. There were sixteen B&M-designed Wing Coasters either under construction or operating worldwide as of December 2020 (14 operational, 2 under construction).

History

According to Walter Bolliger, development of the Wing Coaster began between 2007 and 2008. In 2010, Bolliger & Mabillard announced a prototype Wing Coaster design that would be built at Merlin Entertainments' Gardaland. It became known as Raptor, which opened on 1 April 2011. A year later, Merlin Entertainments opened a second Wing Coaster on 15 March 2012, called The Swarm at Thorpe Park.

In the United States, the first Wing Coaster to be announced was X-Flight, which opened at Six Flags Great America on 16 May 2012. Dollywood's Wild Eagle actually opened earlier on 24 March 2012, making it the first Wing Coaster in North America. On 13 August 2012, Cedar Point announced plans to build a new Wing Coaster called GateKeeper, which set new records for a Wing Coaster including longest track length, fastest speed and drop height. The first Wing Coaster in Asia, Parrot Coaster, opened at Ocean Kingdom on 25 January 2014. Thorpe Park announced that the last two rows of The Swarm would be turned backwards – a first for a Wing Coaster – for the 2013 season. On 24 July 2014, Holiday World & Splashin' Safari announced Thunderbird, the first launched Wing Coaster.

Design

The design of a Wing Coaster differs from many traditional steel roller coasters in that its trains are not located above or below the track but rather on the sides, a configuration that give riders the impression of free flight. Also, because there is nothing on top of the track and only steel beams holding each ends of the train together, all current Wing Coasters have an object (that relates to the theme) that covers the steel beams and adds to the experience. The restraints on the trains are also different. Instead of simply having the traditional over-the-shoulder restraint bar used on many inverted roller coasters, the Wing Coaster restraints similar to Bolliger & Mabillard's Flying Coaster which includes a vest restraint and a waist-level restraint, with bars on the side for the rider to hold on to. The Wing Coaster's differences extended to the station layout of the station, which requires the queue to split in two halves, allowing riders to board the train where the seats sit level with the track.

Installations

Bolliger & Mabillard has built or is in the process of building a total of fifteen Wing Coasters as of January 2018. The roller coasters are listed in order of opening dates.

| Mandrill Mayhem || Chessington World Of Adventures ||  United Kingdom || ||  ||
|-

Similar rides
Prior to the development of the Wing Coaster, in 2007, Intamin debuted a version of an Accelerator Coaster with modified trains similar to those used on 4th Dimension roller coasters and Wing Coasters. Known as a Wing Rider Coaster, Furius Baco at PortAventura Park was the first and currently only ride of its type.

In addition to the Wing Rider Coaster, Intamin also introduced a model named Wing Coaster. The first installation was Skyrush at Hersheypark in 2012, and the latest Flying Aces at Ferrari World Abu Dhabi. The trains feature four seats per row: two center seats positioned over the track and have a floor, while two hang over the side and are the "wings".

The Wing Coaster is also similar to the 4th Dimension roller coaster concept from the 1990s. However, unlike 4th Dimension roller coasters, cars on a Wing Coaster train do not spin — they are locked in place. Examples of 4th Dimension roller coasters include X2 at Six Flags Magic Mountain and Eejanaika at Fuji-Q Highland.

References

External links

 

Types of roller coaster
 
Roller coasters manufactured by Bolliger & Mabillard